Keith Sebelius Lake, formerly known as Norton Reservoir, is a man-made reservoir on Prairie Dog Creek in northwest Kansas. Built and managed by the U.S. Bureau of Reclamation, it is used for flood control, irrigation, recreation, and local water supply. Prairie Dog State Park is located on its shore.

History
The effects of a 1935 flash flood of the Republican River and its tributaries, including Prairie Dog Creek, led the U.S. Bureau of Reclamation to include the creek in its plans for flood control. The Flood Control Act of 1944 approved and the Flood Control Act of 1946 authorized development of a reservoir on the creek as part of the Pick-Sloan Missouri Basin Program. Construction of Norton Dam began in December 1961, and the initial storage of water in Norton Reservoir started in October 1964.

In March 1958, the nearby community of Norton, Kansas secured a contract with the U.S. government to receive 1,600 acre-feet of water annually. In 1963, the Kansas state government granted the community a water right to that amount of storage in the reservoir. Norton began to use the reservoir as a municipal water supply in September 1965.

In 1981, the U.S. Congress renamed the reservoir Keith Sebelius Lake after retiring U.S. Representative and Norton native Keith Sebelius.

Geography
It lies in northwest Kansas in the High Plains region of the Great Plains. The reservoir is located entirely within Norton County.

The reservoir is impounded at its northeastern end by Norton Dam. Prairie Dog Creek is both the reservoir's primary inflow from the southwest and its outflow to the northeast.

U.S. Route 36 and Kansas Highway 383 run concurrently east-west north of the reservoir. Kansas Highway 261 runs north-south between U.S. 36 and Prairie Dog State Park on the reservoir's north shore.

Hydrography
The surface area, surface elevation, and water volume of the reservoir fluctuate based on inflow and local climatic conditions. In terms of capacity, the Bureau of Reclamation vertically divides the reservoir into a set of pools based on volume and water level, and it considers the reservoir full when filled to the capacity of its active conservation pool.

Since the reservoir's initial flooding, sedimentation has gradually accumulated on the reservoir bottom thus raising its elevation.

Infrastructure
Norton Dam is a zoned earth-fill embankment dam with rock riprap on its upstream face. A spillway structure controlled by three radial gates is located at the southeast end of the dam. Outlet works at the northwest end of the dam manage outflow into Prairie Dog Creek and the city of Norton's municipal water supply.

Management
The U.S. Bureau of Reclamation maintains and operates the reservoir and Norton Dam. The U.S. Army Corps of Engineers provides water regulation procedures for flood control. Downstream canals and structures which use portions of the reservoir's water for irrigation are managed by Almena Irrigation District No. 5.

Parks and recreation
The KDWP operates the  Prairie Dog State Park on the reservoir's north shore. It includes boat ramps, camping facilities, a hiking trail, and a swimming beach.

Keith Sebelius Lake is open for sport fishing year-round. Hunting is permitted on the public land around the reservoir although it is restricted in certain areas.

Points of interest
The KDWP preserves two vintage 19th-century buildings in Prairie Dog State Park:  a one-room schoolhouse and the last standing original adobe house in Kansas. The park also hosts a growing prairie dog town.

Wildlife
Fish species resident in the reservoir include bluegill, channel catfish, crappie, flathead catfish, largemouth bass, saugeye, spotted bass, walleye, and wiper. Game animals living around the reservoir include mule deer, ducks, quail, cottontail rabbits, turkeys, and white-tailed deer.

The reservoir is surrounded almost entirely by shortgrass prairie.

See also
 List of Kansas state parks
 List of lakes, reservoirs, and dams in Kansas
 List of rivers of Kansas

References

External links
 Almena Unit, U.S. Bureau of Reclamation
 Keith Sebelius Reservoir / Norton Wildlife Area, Kansas Department of Wildlife, Parks and Tourism
 Norton Dam, U.S. Bureau of Reclamation
 Prairie Dog State Park, Kansas Department of Wildlife, Parks and Tourism

Protected areas of Norton County, Kansas
Sebelius Lake
Dams in Kansas
United States Bureau of Reclamation dams
Dams completed in 1964
Bodies of water of Norton County, Kansas